Recuay District is one of ten districts of the Recuay Province in Peru.

Its capital is the town of Recuay in the Callejón de Huaylas Valley.

Recuay culture

The Recuay culture was a highland culture of Peru that flourished in 200 BC-600 AD and was related to the Moche culture of the north coast. It is named after the Recuay area.

The Recuay area is very close to the earlier Chavin culture centre of Chavin de Huantar that lies just to the west. Thus, the Recuay originally occupied much of the territory of the Chavin, and were greatly influenced by them.

The culture especially flourished in the Callejón de Huaylas region, and along the Marañón River. It also spread to the valleys of the Santa, Casma and Huarmey rivers. To the north, it reached the area of Pashash, in Pallasca. Willkawayin was one of their important settlements.

See also 
 Puka Allpa
 Puka Hirka

References

Lau, George F., Andean expressions : art and archaeology of the Recuay culture. Iowa City : University of Iowa Press, 2011

Districts of the Recuay Province
Districts of the Ancash Region